The Golden Age Players is a Canadian children's dramatic television series that aired on CBC Television in 1957.

Premise
Children acted in dramatic plays such as Empress and the Four Seasons, The Snow Queen (by Hans Christian Andersen) and The Birthday of the Infanta (or The Infanta's Dwarf, by Oscar Wilde). Wardrobe was by Jacqueline Boss, whose son Valentine was the series director.

Scheduling
This half-hour series was broadcast on alternate Mondays at 5:00 p.m. from 14 October to 23 December 1957. Chez Nous appeared on the other Mondays.

References

External links
 

CBC Television original programming
1957 Canadian television series debuts
1957 Canadian television series endings
1950s Canadian children's television series
Black-and-white Canadian television shows
Television shows filmed in Montreal